Suppose that  and  are two monoidal categories and
 and 
are two lax monoidal functors between those categories.

A monoidal natural transformation

between those functors is a natural transformation  between the underlying functors such that the diagrams
  and  

A symmetric monoidal natural transformation is a monoidal natural transformation between symmetric monoidal functors.

References

Monoidal categories